Shishova is a surname. Notable people with the surname include: 

Ekaterina Shishova (born 1978), Russian water polo player
Iuliia Shishova (born 1997), Russian Paralympic swimmer
Lyudmila Shishova (1940–2004), Soviet fencer and coach

Russian-language surnames